Sherwood is a small neighbourhood in west Edmonton, Alberta, Canada.  Originally part of the Town of Jasper Place, it became a part of Edmonton when Jasper Place amalgamated with Edmonton in 1964.

The neighbourhood is bounded on the west by 156 Street, on the east by 149 Street, on the north by 95 Avenue, and on the south by 92 Avenue.

The community is represented by the West Jasper/Sherwood Community League. Which maintains a community hall, outdoor rink and tennis courts located at 152 Street and 96 Avenue. The Sherwood Community League operated as a separate entity from 1949 until 1985 when it merged with the West Jasper Place Community League.

Demographics 

Residential development 
Almost half of the dwellings in Sherwood were built between the end of World War II and 1960.  Just over six out of every ten residences (63%) are single-family dwellings.  Another 34% are apartments in low-rise buildings with fewer than five stories.  Most of the remaining dwellings are duplexes.  Just over half of the residences (56%) are owner-occupied, with the remainder being rented.

Schools 
Sherwood Elementary School, operated by the Edmonton Public School System, is located immediately to the north in the adjacent neighbourhood of West Jasper Place.

Shopping and services 
Neighbourhood residents have access to shopping and medical services at the Meadowlark Health and Shopping Centre located to the south west in the adjoining neighbourhood of Meadowlark Park.

To the north of the neighbourhood, along 149 Street, is the Jasper Gates Shopping Centre.

Surrounding neighbourhoods 
The neighbourhood is surrounded on all sides by residential neighbourhoods.

See also 
 Edmonton Federation of Community Leagues

References

External links 
 Sherwood Neighbourhood Profile

Neighbourhoods in Edmonton